Buffy the Vampire Slayer comics refer to comic books based on the television series Buffy the Vampire Slayer. While many of these comics were published when the television show was on air they are not all considered canonical and often deal with characters who do not appear in the television series, most notably in the Tales of the Slayers and Tales of the Vampires mini-series.

The first series of books were published by Dark Horse Comics between 1998 and 2004, originally in comic format but then gathered into volumes of trade paperbacks. A small number of Buffy comics have not been included in trade paperbacks, such as the books entitled "Giles", "Jonathan", and "Reunion".

Following the television series finale, Dark Horse began releasing new books titled Season Eight, Nine, and Ten, and various spin-offs, which are written and/or supervised by creator Joss Whedon and officially recognized as canon to the show. In 2007, Dark Horse allowed the rights to produce the comics for Buffy's companion show Angel to lapse, and they were picked up for a short time by IDW Publishing, which released the canon series Angel: After the Fall among other non-canon titles. Dark Horse reacquired the rights in 2010 and went on to release the official Angel: Season Six and the spin-off series Angel & Faith.

In 2018 it was announced after 20 years at Dark Horse Comics, the license for Buffy and all related material will transfer to BOOM! Studios. The first issue of the reboot series was released in January 2019.

Relation to the TV series
Series creator Joss Whedon and a number of writers involved with the television series authored many of the comic books. Overviews summarizing the comic books' storylines were written early in the writing process and were 'approved' by both Fox and Joss Whedon (or his office), and the books were therefore later published as official Buffy merchandise.

The stories in the Buffy comics take place in between episodes of the Buffy the Vampire Slayer TV series, and continue after the series ended. Issues 1 to 63 take place during the period that the series was still on air, and none are written by Joss Whedon himself. The earlier issues are not very easy to place in the series other than the season they are set in. The stories get more specific later on, however; for example, the Oz Buffy comics fill in the story line of Oz's character after he leaves the TV series, and the Death of Buffy comics clearly take place between Seasons 5 and 6 of the series.

Starting in 2007, a new series of Buffy comics has been produced, also published by Dark Horse Comics. These are a canonical continuation of the television series and as such are considered Buffy the Vampire Slayer Season Eight. One of the other comics considered canon is the 8-part series Fray, since the main character, Melaka Fray, appears in Season 8.
Buffy the Vampire Slayer Season Eight takes place after the series ended, and the issues are written by Joss Whedon to continue the storyline. A subsequent "Season Nine" series followed, accompanied by a companion or sister-series "Angel & Faith" which is set during the same time period and interchanges plots and characters. "Season Ten" debuted in March 2014, followed by the continuation of its companion series the following month.

Dark Horse Comics (1998-2018)
 Pre-Season Eight Stories 
These stories are first published by Dark Horse comics, later most of Buffy stories are collected in Buffy comic books.

 Buffy the Vampire Slayer Classics (1998-2003) 

 Buffy specials (1998-2003) 

 Buffy mini-series (1999-2001) 

 Buffy tales (2002-2009) 

 Dark Horse Presents 

 Dark Horse Extra 

 TV Guide 

 Trade Paperbacks 

1. Compilations of most of the material listed above:
 The Remaining Sunlight
 Uninvited Guests
 Bad Blood
 Crash Test Demons
 Pale Reflections
 The Blood of Carthage
 Food Chain
 Past Lives
 Autumnal
 Out of the Woodwork
 False Memories
 Ugly Little Monsters
 Haunted
 The Death of Buffy
 Note from the Underground
 Viva Las Buffy!
 Slayer, Interrupted
 A Stake to the Heart
 Spike and Dru
 Willow and Tara
 Oz
 Tales of the Slayers
 Tales of the Vampires

2. Compilations of all of the material listed above:

 Buffy the Vampire Slayer Omnibus Vol. 1
 Buffy the Vampire Slayer Omnibus Vol. 2
 Buffy the Vampire Slayer Omnibus Vol. 3
 Buffy the Vampire Slayer Omnibus Vol. 4
 Buffy the Vampire Slayer Omnibus Vol. 5
 Buffy the Vampire Slayer Omnibus Vol. 6
 Buffy the Vampire Slayer Omnibus Vol. 7
 Tales

 Season Eight (2007–2011) 
The series serves as a canonical continuation of the television series Buffy the Vampire Slayer, and follows the events of that show's final televised season. It is produced by Joss Whedon, who wrote or co-wrote three of the series arcs and several one-shot stories. The series was followed by Season Nine in 2011.

 Specials 

 Trade Paperbacks 
 The Long Way Home
 No Future for You
 Wolves at the Gate
 Time of Your Life
 Predators and Prey
 Retreat
 Twilight
 Last Gleaming

 Season Nine (2011–2013) 
When Buffy the Vampire Slayer Season Eight was finished, Dark Horse Comics decided to publish a new comic season of Buffy. They also decided to follow up the series Angel: After the Fall with the publication of Angel & Faith as a part of Buffy the Vampire Slayer Season Nine.

 Buffy 

 Trade Paperbacks 
 Freefall
 On Your Own
 Guarded
 Welcome to the Team
 The Core

 Angel & Faith 

 Trade Paperbacks 
 Live Through This
 Daddy Issues
 Family Reunion
 Death and Consequences
 What You Want, Not What You Need

 Spike: A Dark Place 

 Trade Paperback 
 Spike: A Dark Place

 Willow: Wonderland 

 Trade Paperback 
 Willow: Wonderland

 Season Ten (2014–2016) 
Season Ten is a Buffy comic series published after Buffy the Vampire Slayer Season Nine.

 Buffy 

 Trade Paperbacks 
 New Rules
 I Wish
 Love Dares You
 Old Demons
 Pieces on the Ground
 Own It

 Angel & Faith 

 Trade Paperbacks 
 Where the River Meets the Sea
 Lost and Found
 United
 A Little More Than Kin
 A Tale Of Two Families

 Season Eleven (2016–2018) 
Dark Horse began publishing Season Eleven in November 2016. This season consists of a 12-issue Buffy series, a 12-issue Angel series, and a 4-issue Giles miniseries.

 Buffy Season Eleven 

 Trade Paperbacks 
The Spread of Their Evil...
One Girl in All the World

Angel Season Eleven

Trade Paperbacks
Out of the Past
Time and Tide
Dark Reflections

Giles Season Eleven

Trade Paperbacks
Girl Blue

 Season Twelve (2018) 

Trade Paperbacks
The Reckoning

 Fray (2001–2003) Fray is an eight-issue comic book limited series, a futuristic spin-off of the television series Buffy the Vampire Slayer. Written by Buffy creator Joss Whedon, the series follows a Slayer named Melaka Fray, a chosen one in a time where vampires (called "lurks") are returning to the slums of New York City, and the rich-poor divide is even greater. Volume one is drawn by Karl Moline (pencils) and Andy Owens (inks).

Trade Paperbacks 
 Fray: Future Slayer

BOOM! Studios (2019-)

In 2019, a new Buffy the Vampire Slayer comic book series was released by Boom! Studios; this version of the series is a reboot with no continuity to the television series or previous comics. Despite being set in an alternate modern-day continuity, the likenesses of the series’ actors are still used to represent their respective characters.

Main Series (2019-)

Trade Paperbacks 
 High School is Hell
 Once Bitten
 From Beneath You
 Frenemies
 The Biggest Bad
 Secrets of the Slayer
 The World Without Shrimp
 A Rainbow upon Her Head
 Forget Me Not
 We Are the Slayer

One Shots (2019-)

Willow (2020)

Trade Paperbacks 
Willow

Hellmouth (2019-2020)

Trade Paperbacks 
Buffy the Vampire Slayer: Hellmouth

Buffy the Last Vampire Slayer (2021)

Trade Paperbacks 
Buffy the Last Vampire Slayer

Comics by writer 
See Buffyverse comics#Comics by writer

See also

 List of feminist comic books
 Portrayal of women in comics

References

External links
Official BOOM! Comics Buffy the Vampire Slayers Comics Home
Official Dark Horse Buffy the Vampire Slayer Comics Home
The Unofficial Comic Book Guide to Buffy the Vampire Slayer

1998 comics debuts
Comics about women
 
Comics by Brad Meltzer
Fantasy comics
Feminist comics
Horror comics
Comics about magic
Werewolf comics
Zombies in comics
Vampires in comics
Comic lists by franchise